The 1964 United States Senate election in Michigan took place on November 3, 1964. Incumbent Democratic U.S. Senator Philip Hart was re-elected to a second term in office over Republican Elly Peterson.

Republican primary

Candidates
Edward A. Meany
James F. O'Neill, candidate for U.S. Representative in 1962
Elly Peterson, former vice chairwoman of the Michigan Republican Party

Results

General election

Results

See also 
 1964 United States Senate elections

References

Michigan
1964
1964 Michigan elections